Richárd Hoffmann (born 17 November 1978) is a Hungarian footballer who plays for Békéscsabai Előre FC as striker.

External links
Profile at hlsz.hu

1978 births
Living people
Hungarian footballers
Association football defenders
Budapesti VSC footballers
Békéscsaba 1912 Előre footballers
Footballers from Budapest